Protzia is a genus of mites belonging to the family Protziidae.

The species of this genus are found in Europe, Japan and Northern America.

Species:
 Protzia annularis Lundblad, 1954 
 Protzia athletica Gerecke, 1996

References

Trombidiformes
Trombidiformes genera